Izmaylov, İzmaylov or Izmailov is a masculine surname common in the former Soviet countries, derived from the given name Ismail. Its feminine counterpart is Izmailova, İzmayılova or Izmaylova. It may refer to:
Alexander Izmailov (1779–1831), Russian fabulist, prosaist, and journalist
Chingis Izmailov (1944–2011), Russian psychophysiologist and psychophysicist
Enver İzmaylov, Ukrainian folk-jazz musician
Galiya Izmaylova (1923–2010), Soviet ballerina and People's Artist of the USSR
Gerasim Izmailov, (1745–1795) Russian sea explorer
Katerina Izmailova (swimmer) (born 1977), Tajikistani swimmer 
Marat Izmailov, (born 1982) Russian association football player
Michelle Izmaylov, (born 1991) Russian/American novelist
Sergey Izmaylov (born 1975), Ukrainian triple jumper
Tolekan Ismailova,  Kyrgyz human rights defender
Vyacheslav Izmailov, army major and later correspondent, human rights hero of the First Chechen War in the 1990s
Züleyxa Izmailova (born 1985), Estonian politician, chairwoman of the Estonian Greens party

See also
Ismailov
Dmitri Shostakovich's 1934 opera Lady Macbeth of the Mtsensk District is sometimes referred to as Ismailova
Katerina Izmailova (film), a 1966 Soviet film adaptation of Lady Macbeth of the Mtsensk District
İsmailoğlu

References

Surnames of Turkmenistan origin
Turkmen-language surnames
Azerbaijani-language surnames
Kazakh-language surnames
Kyrgyz-language surnames
Russian-language surnames
Tajik-language surnames
Uzbek-language surnames
Surnames of Kyrgyzstani origin
Surnames of Kazakhstani origin
Surnames of Uzbekistani origin
Surnames of Tajikistani origin
Surnames
Patronymic surnames
Surnames from given names